The 1993 All-Ireland Senior Club Camogie Championship for the leading clubs in the women's team field sport of camogie was won by Glen Rovers, who defeated Mullagh from Galway in the final, played at Ballinasloe.

Arrangements
The championship was organised on the traditional provincial system used in Gaelic Games since the 1880s, with the other two provinces Connacht and Leinster represented by Loughgiel and Lisdowney, who had the services of four players from the disbanded St Paul’s, Ann Downey, Clare Jones, Angela Downey and Noelle O'Driscoll. Lynn Dunlea who had joined Glen Rovers from the Cloughduv club scored 4-3 for Glen as they defeated Lisdowney in the semi-final.

The Final
Denise Cronin dominated midfield and the speedy and skilful forwards ran up a big score in the final.

Final stages

References

External links
 Camogie Association

1993 in camogie
1993